Arnt Severin Ulstrup (24 September 1862 – 1922) was a Norwegian physician and politician for the Conservative Party.

He was elected to the Norwegian Parliament in 1910 from the constituency Østerrisør, and was re-elected in 1913.

Born in Brekkestø, he enrolled as a student in 1883 and graduated as cand.med. in 1890. He first opened his own physician's office in Lillesand, in 1890, but moved to Risør in 1891 and became town physician there in 1910. He was a member of Risør city council, and was also director of the local savings bank for some time.

References

1862 births
1922 deaths
Members of the Storting
Conservative Party (Norway) politicians
Aust-Agder politicians
Norwegian municipal physicians
People from Risør